European Para Table Tennis Championships are a biennial sport event for para table tennis players who represent a European country. It is one of the first regional para table tennis championships to be held. France have so far earned the most medals in these championships.

Locations

* Rotterdam will be hosting a multi-sport European event in August 2023 titled European Para Championships. It will be the first multi-sport event to host European countries in Paralympic sports.

All-time medal count
As of 2019.

See also
European Table Tennis Championships
Table tennis at the Summer Paralympics
World Para Table Tennis Championships

References

External links
Medal Collections

Table tennis competitions
Para table tennis
Recurring sporting events established in 1985